Fernandocrambus chillanicus is a moth in the family Crambidae. It was described by Arthur Gardiner Butler in 1883. It is found in Chile.

References

Crambini
Moths described in 1883
Moths of South America
Endemic fauna of Chile